Naza Alakija is a climate change activist who founded the Nigerian group Social Accelerator for A Green Economy (SAGE) Foundation in 2019 (not to be confused with the Sage Foundation established by British software company Sage Group in 2015).

Biography 
Alakija was born in Tehran, Iran. Her family relocated to the United Kingdom when she was nine.

The 2022 climate change documentary Overheated was produced by Maggie Baird and Naza Alakija, under the director Yassa Khan.

References

Iranian environmentalists
Year of birth missing (living people)